Eriko Watanabe may refer to:

 Eriko Watanabe (judge), a judge in the Supreme Court of Japan
 Eri Watanabe, a Japanese actress

References